The 2015–16 Los Angeles Kings season was the 49th season (48th season of play) for the National Hockey League franchise that was established on June 5, 1967. The season began on October 7, 2015 and ended on April 23, 2016, respectively, both against the San Jose Sharks.

Off-season
On June 29, 2015, the Kings announced that they had terminated the contract of forward Mike Richards due to "a material breach of his Standard Player's Contract."

Standings

Schedule and results

Pre-season

Regular season

Playoffs

Player statistics
Final stats

Skaters

Goaltenders

†Denotes player spent time with another team before joining the Kings. Stats reflect time with the Kings only.
‡Traded mid-season. Stats reflect time with the Kings only.
Bold/italics denotes franchise record

Notable achievements

Awards

Milestones

Transactions 
The Kings have been involved in the following transactions during the 2015–16 season:

Trades

Notes
Philadelphia to retain 50% ($2.25 million) of salary as part of trade.
Philadelphia to retain 50% ($1.8 million) of salary as part of trade.
Los Angeles to retain 15% ($225,000) of salary as part of trade.
Chicago to retain 50% ($1.125 million) of salary as part of trade.

Free agents acquired

Free agents lost

Claimed via waivers

Lost via waivers

Lost via retirement

Player signings

Draft picks

Below are the Los Angeles Kings' selections at the 2015 NHL Entry Draft, to be held on June 26–27, 2015, at the BB&T Center in Sunrise, Florida.

Draft notes

 The Los Angeles Kings' first-round pick went to the Boston Bruins as the result of a trade on June 26, 2015 that sent Milan Lucic to Los Angeles in exchange for Martin Jones, Colin Miller and this pick.
 The Los Angeles Kings' second-round pick was re-acquired as the result of a trade on March 5, 2014 that sent Hudson Fasching and Nicolas Deslauriers to Buffalo in exchange for Brayden McNabb, Jonathan Parker, Los Angeles' second-round pick in 2014 and this pick. Buffalo previously acquired this pick as the result of a trade on April 1, 2013 that sent Robyn Regehr to Los Angeles in exchange for a second-round pick in 2014 and this pick.
 The Columbus Blue Jackets' fourth-round pick went to the Los Angeles Kings as the result of a trade on June 27, 2015 that sent a fourth-round pick in 2015 (104th overall) and a sixth-round pick in 2016 to Philadelphia in exchange for this pick.
Philadelphia previously acquired this pick as the result of a trade on June 23, 2014 that sent Scott Hartnell to Columbus in exchange for R.J. Umberger and this pick.

 The Los Angeles Kings' fourth-round pick went to the Philadelphia Flyers as the result of a trade on June 27, 2015 that sent Columbus' fourth-round pick in 2015 to Los Angeles in exchange for a sixth-round pick in 2016 and this pick.
 The Los Angeles Kings' sixth-round pick went to the Chicago Blackhawks as the result of a trade on July 16, 2013 that sent Daniel Carcillo to Los Angeles in exchange for this pick (being conditional at the time of the trade). The condition – Chicago will receive a sixth-round pick in 2015 if Carcillo plays less than 40 games with Los Angeles during the 2013–14 NHL season – was converted on January 4, 2014 when Carcillo was traded to the New York Rangers after playing only 26 games with the Kings.
 The New Jersey Devils' seventh-round pick went to the Los Angeles Kings as the result of a trade on June 30, 2013 that sent a seventh-round pick in 2013 to New Jersey in exchange for this pick.

References

Los Angeles Kings seasons
Los Angeles Kings season, 2015-16
LA Kings
LA Kings